The Armenian Populist Party was a political party founded in March 1917 in Russian Armenia. Its members had previously belonged to the Russian Kadet party. The Populists had a liberal programme and drew their support from middle-class Armenians in Tbilisi and Baku.

History
The Populists had 43 of the 204 representatives in the Armenian National Congress of October 1917 and two of the 15 seats in the subsequent Armenian National Council.

See also

 Programs of political parties in Armenia
 Politics of Armenia

References

Sources
Richard G. Hovannisian The Republic of Armenia: The First Year 1918-19 (University of California, 1971)
Anahide Ter-Minassian La République d'Arménie 1918-20 (Éditions Complexe, 2006 ed.) 

1917 establishments in Russia
Defunct political parties in Armenia
1910s in Armenia
Political parties established in 1917
Political parties of minorities in Imperial Russia
Political parties of the Russian Revolution
Political parties with year of disestablishment missing
Political history of Armenia
Liberal parties in Armenia